Zlavast is a village in the municipality of Bugojno, Bosnia and Herzegovina. It is roughly 70 km west of Sarajevo.

Demographics 
According to the 2013 census, its population was 242.

References

Populated places in Bugojno